Alfred "Alf" James Higgs (first ¼ 1904 – after 1931) was a Welsh professional rugby league footballer who played in the 1920s.

Background
Alfred Higgs' birth was registered in Talywain, Pontypool district, Wales, and he died in Newport, Wales.

Playing career

International honours
Alf Higgs won a cap for Wales while at Oldham in the 12–20 defeat by England at Central Park, Wigan on Wednesday 11 January 1928.

Challenge Cup Final appearances
Alf Higgs played right-, i.e. number 3, in Halifax's 22–8 victory over York in the 1930–31 Challenge Cup Final during the 1930–31 season at Wembley Stadium, London on Saturday 2 May 1931, in front of a crowd of 40,368.

References

External links
Statistics at orl-heritagetrust.org.uk

1904 births
1930s deaths
Halifax R.L.F.C. players
Oldham R.L.F.C. players
Rugby league players from Pontypool
Rugby league centres
Wales national rugby league team players
Welsh rugby league players